Karanovo, is a village in the municipality of Aytos Municipality, in Burgas Province, in southeastern Bulgaria.

Events
Karanovo is home to some cultural events, including an annual meeting.

References

Villages in Burgas Province